"Plan A" is a song by Argentine rapper and singer Paulo Londra. The song was released by Warner Music Latina on 23 March 2022 as the lead single from Londra's upcoming second studio album. The song was written by Londra alongside its producers Federico Colazo and Matías Rapacioli (the producer-duo known as Hot Plug) and Federico Vindver.

"Plan A" has been called a punk-rock heartbreak song that narrates the end of a relationship. The song debuted at number one on the Billboard Argentina Hot 100 with less than two tracking days, becoming Londra's third number-one single on the chart following "Cuando Te Besé and "Adán y Eva" in 2018.

Charts

Certifications

References

2022 singles
2022 songs
Punk rock songs
Latin rock songs
Paulo Londra songs
Spanish-language songs
Argentina Hot 100 number-one singles
Songs written by Federico Vindver